Cecil Edgar Tilley FRS HonFRSE PGS (14 May 1894 – 24 January 1973) was an Australian-British petrologist and geologist.

Life

He was born in Unley, Adelaide, the youngest child of John Thomas Edward Tilley, a civil engineer from London, and his wife South Australia-born wife, Catherine Jane Nicholas.

Cecil was educated at Adelaide High School, then studied Chemistry and Geology under William Rowan Browne at the University of Adelaide, and the University of Sydney, graduating in 1915.  In 1916, during the First World War, he went to South Queensferry near Edinburgh in Scotland to work as a chemist Department of Explosives Supply. He returned to Australia in December 1918.

He won an Exhibition of 1851 scholarship to the University of Cambridge in 1919, where he studied petrology under Alfred Harker, and completed his PhD in 1922. From 1923 he was employed at Cambridge University, first as demonstrator in petrology, and then lecturer in petrology in 1929. In 1931, following the retirement of Harker, he was appointed as the first Professor of Mineralogy and Petrology. Most of the remainder of his life was spent in England, though he spent 1938–9 in Australia and visited regularly after the Second World War.

In 1929, while investigating a volcanic plug at Scawt Hill, near Larne, Northern Ireland for the Mineralogical Magazine he identified and named the new minerals larnite and scawtite.

In 1938 he was elected a Fellow of the Royal Society of London and served as their Vice President 1949/50. He won the Society's Royal Medal in 1967.

From 1948 to 1951 he was President of the Mineralogical Society of Great Britain. He was President of the Geological Society 1949/50. He was elected an Honorary Fellow of the Royal Society of Edinburgh in 1957.

He died at home in Cambridge on 24 January 1973 aged 78, and his body was cremated.

Family

In 1928 he married Irene Doris Marshall at Holy Trinity Church, Kingsway, London.

They had one daughter.

Publications
Alfred Harker 1859-1939 (1940) co-written with Albert Seward
Waldemar Christofer Brogger 1851-1940 (1941)
Hawaiian Volcanoes (1961)
Origin of Basalt Magmas (1962)

References

External links
 G. A. Chinner, Memorial of Cecil Edgar Tilley 14 May 1894 – 24 January 1973, American Mineralogist, Volume 59, pages 427-437, 1974
  Tilley, Cecil Edgar (1894–1973)  Australian Dictionary of Biography

1894 births
1973 deaths
Fellows of the Royal Society
Foreign associates of the National Academy of Sciences
Wollaston Medal winners
University of Adelaide alumni
Scientists from Adelaide
Royal Medal winners
Presidents of the International Mineralogical Association
Australian emigrants to the United Kingdom
Members of the Royal Swedish Academy of Sciences
University of Sydney alumni
Australian people of English descent
People educated at Adelaide High School
Professorship of Mineralogy and Petrology (Cambridge)